Peter Rodgers Melnick (born July 24, 1958) is an American author and composer for film, television and musical theatre.

Career
Some of Melnick’s earlier film score credits include L.A. Story, The Only Thrill, Convicts, and Farce of the Penguins. His television credits include the PBS's, Cinema's Exiles: From Hitler to Hollywood, Indictment: The McMartin Trial, Grand Avenue, and Lily Dale by Horton Foote.

His first produced musical was Adrift in Macao, featuring script and lyrics by Christopher Durang. Melnick then collaborated with Bill Russell on The Last Smoker in America, a musical comedy about a dysfunctional family struggling with a new law forbidding smoking. It opened in Columbus, Ohio in late 2010.

Melnick and Russell have also worked together on two musical one-acts, Patter for the Floating Lady, based on the eponymous Steve Martin, and A Bad Spell, adapted from a Virginia Moriconi short story Simple Arithmetic.

Personal life
Melnick is the son of Daniel Melnick and Linda Rodgers, and grandson of Richard Rodgers and grew up in New York City. He graduated from The Choate School (which later merged with Rosemary Hall to become Choate Rosemary Hall) and attended Harvard College, Berklee College of Music, and the Guildhall School of Music and Drama. He also studied jazz with the Jaki Byard.

Melnick lives in Montecito, California, with wife, Talia Van-Son. He has two children by a previous marriage.

Works

Musical theatre scores
 Adrift in Macao (2007)
 The Last Smoker in America (2012)

Film scores
 Vampire Knights (1987)
 Homesick, film short (1988)
 Get Smart, Again! (1989); TV movie
 Out of Sight, Out of Mind (1990)
 Bad Attitudes (1991); TV movie
 L.A. Story (1991)
 Convicts (1991)
 Only You (1992)
 In the Name of the Father, film short (1992)
 Running Mates (1992); TV movie
 Arctic Blue (1993)
 12:01 (1993); TV movie
 Indictment: The McMartin Trial (1995); TV movie
 For Hope (1996); TV movie
 Grand Avenue (1996); TV movie
 No One Could Protect Her (1996)
 Two Mothers for Zachary (1996); TV movie
 Lily Dale (1996) TV movie
 Every 9 Seconds (1997); TV movie
 Jitters (1997); TV movie
 The Only Thrill (1997)
 Time to Say Goodbye? (1997)
 Becoming Dick (2000); TV movie
 Tak For Alt: Survival of a Human Spirit Documentary Feature
 Mermaid (2000); TV movie
 Taking Back Our Town (2001); TV movie
 Call Waiting, (2004)
 Farce of the Penguins (2006)
 Benjamin (2018)

Television scores
 The Death of a Star (1987) TV documentary
 The Mystery of the Master Builders (1988) TV documentary
 Nightingales (1989) TV series
 The KGB, the Computer and Me (1990); TV documentary
 Testing Dirty (1990); TV series: ABC Afterschool Specials
 Magic (1991); TV series
 Edgar Allan Poe: Terror of the Soul (1995); TV series documentary: American Masters
 Robert Rauschenberg: Inventive Genius (1999); TV series documentary: American Masters
 Cinema's Exiles: From Hitler to Hollywood (2009); TV documentary
 James McNeill Whistler: The Case for Beauty'' (2014) TV documentary

References

External links
 
 Peter Rodgers Melnick at the Internet Off Broadway Database
 

American male conductors (music)
American music arrangers
American film score composers
American people of German-Jewish descent
American television composers
Musicians from New York City
American blues guitarists
American male guitarists
Jewish American musicians
1958 births
Living people
Harvard College alumni
Choate Rosemary Hall alumni
Berklee College of Music alumni
Alumni of the Guildhall School of Music and Drama
20th-century American guitarists
Classical musicians from New York (state)
20th-century American conductors (music)
21st-century American conductors (music)
American male film score composers
20th-century American male musicians
21st-century American male musicians
21st-century American Jews